The South's Oldest Rivalry may refer to:

 South's Oldest Rivalry, the football game between the University of North Carolina at Chapel Hill and the University of Virginia
 Deep South's Oldest Rivalry, the football game between Auburn University and the University of Georgia
 Capital Cup, the football game between the College of William and Mary and the University of Richmond
 I-85 rivalry, the football game between Wofford College and Furman University, dating to 1889.